New Classical Adventure (NCA) is a classical music record label based in Hamburg, Germany and founded in 1992.

References

External links
http://www.ncamusic.com/

New Classical Adventure
German record labels
1992 establishments in Germany